Embarrass may refer to:

Communities
 Embarrass Township, Edgar County, Illinois, United States
 Embarrass Township, St. Louis County, Minnesota, United States
 Embarrass, Wisconsin, United States

Other
 Embarrass River (disambiguation)

See also
 Embarras (disambiguation)
 Embarrassment (disambiguation)